Estadio de Béisbol Beisborama 72 is a stadium in the Mexican city of Córdoba, Veracruz.  It is primarily used for baseball and is the home field of the Cafeteros de Córdoba who play in the Veracruz Winter League.  It holds 12,000 people and was built in 1972 (and renovated in 1998).

References 

1972 establishments in Mexico
Beisborama 72
Sports venues completed in 1972
Sports venues in Veracruz
Buildings and structures in Córdoba, Veracruz